The 1960 Winnipeg Blue Bombers, defending Grey Cup champions, finished in first place in the W.I.F.U. with a league-best record of 14–2.  Their 453 points scored were the most in the CFL (although their 28.3 points per game was slightly less than the 28.6 of Ottawa Rough Riders, who scored 400 points but in the East's shorter 14-game schedule).  Their 239 points allowed were only 14 more than the Edmonton Eskimos, and their +214 points differential dwarfed Ottawa's +117, which had the second-best total.  Their first-place finish earned them the bye into the WIFU Finals.  They took the first game of the best two-of-three Finals by defeating Edmonton 22–16 in Edmonton, but lost the next two in Winnipeg by scores of 10–5 and 4–2, bringing an abrupt end to an otherwise dominant season.

1960 Preseason
On July 29, the Blue Bombers played the BC Lions in Cedar Rapids, Iowa.  Part of the local appeal was the presence on three former University of Iowa stars, Kenny Ploen and Ray Jauch of the Blue Bombers, and Willie Fleming of the BC Lions.  The Blue Bombers defeated the Lions by a score of 13–7 in front of 12,583 fans.

1960 regular season

Fullback and punter Charlie Shepard set a record with a 95-yard punt for a single in the victory over the Saskatchewan Roughriders on September 12.

Injuries
The Blue Bombers lost tackle Buddy Tinsley for two games with a facial injury and fullback Tony Kehrer for the season with a leg fracture, from injuries sustained in the victory over the BC Lions on September 17.  End Farrell Funston was lost for the season after suffering a separated shoulder in the victory over the BC Lions on October 13.

Quarterback Kenny Ploen broke a bone in his throwing hand in the third quarter of the first game of the WIFU Final in Edmonton.  At that point, Vernon Cole took over at quarterback while Ploen shifted to safety, for the balance of game one and all of game two.

Buddy Tinsley Night
The Blue Bombers honored their 11-year veteran tackle with "Buddy Tinsley Night" at half-time during their Thursday, October 13, 1960, game versus the BC Lions.  Tinsley, a Baylor grad, had been an all-star in seven of the previous ten seasons.  Coach Bud Grant said the team requested a special players' meeting, without Tinsley, to prepare.  The Winnipeg crowd of 16,773 was delighted when Tinsley lined up at fullback and took a hand-off from quarterback Kenny Ploen over from the BC one-yard line for a touchdown late in the fourth quarter.

Coincidentally, three other Blue Bomber linemen also scored touchdowns, although all three—by center Garland Warren, guard Cornell Piper and linebacker Jack Delveaux—came on BC fumbles.

CFL commissioner Syd Halter took a dim view of the length of the ceremony for Tinsley.  He slapped the Bombers with a $100 fine for the delay caused to the start of the second half.

Season Standings

1960 Season schedule

1960 Preseason

1960 regular season

1960 Playoffs

Western Conference Finals
(best two-out-of-three series)

 Edmonton won the series two games to one.  Edmonton advanced to play the Ottawa Rough Riders in the Grey Cup.

1960 CFL Schenley Award Nominees

Herb Gray was the WIFU nominee for CFL Most Outstanding Lineman Schenley Award, and won the award over Kaye Vaughan of the Ottawa Rough Riders.

References

Winnipeg Blue Bombers seasons
Winnipeg Blue Bombers
1960 Canadian Football League season by team